List of Serbian folk songs:

'Ajd' d' idemo, Rado
'Ajde Jano
'Ajde Kato
Četir' konja debela
Čuješ, seko
'Ej, čija frula
Igrale se delije
Imam jednu želju
Mila Majko
Moj Milane
Na te mislim
Ne vredi plakati
Oj, Jelo, Jelo
Oj, Moravo
 Oj Srbijo mati
 Oj Srbijo, mila mati
Pred Senkinom kućom
Stani, stani Ibar vodo
Tamo daleko
U ranu zoru
Već odavno spremam svog mrkova
Višnjičića
Volem Diku
Vidovdan
Vranjanka
Bojerka
Goranine ćafanine
 Himna kosovskih junaka
Gora ječi
Gusta mi magla padnala
Marijo, bela kumrijo
 Kreće se lađa francuska
More izgrejala
Moj golube
Nebo
Niko nema što Srbin imade
Oblak se vije
Odvoji se grojze od lojze
Otvori mi belo lenče
Preleteše ptice
Rasti, rasti
Čubro Marko

External links
Play or download Serbian folk music
Play Serbian folk music DSsound.com
All Latest and Old Folk Download

Serbian folk music

Songs about Serbia